Maryam (Arabic synonym of "Mary") is the 19th chapter (sūrah) of the Qur'an with 98 verses (āyāt). The 114 chapters in the Quran are roughly ordered by size. The Quranic chapter is named after Mary, mother of Jesus (Isa), and the Virgin Mary in Christian belief. It recounts the events leading up to the birth of Jesus, subject matter covered in Luke 1 of the Christian Bible. The text of the surah refers to many known prophetic figures, including Isaac, Jacob, Moses, Aaron, Ishmael, Enoch aka Idris, Adam, Zechariah and Noah.

The Birmingham Quran manuscript preserves the final eight verses (Q19:91–98), on parchment radiocarbon dated to between 568ce/56bh and 645/25ah. The Sanaa manuscript, dated between 578ce/44 bh and 669/49ah, includes verses 2–28.

From the perspective of Islamic tradition, (asbāb al-nuzūl), it is an earlier "Meccan Surah", believed to have been revealed sooner than the later revelations in Medina. Theodor Nöldeke's chronology identifies this Surah as the 58th Surah delivered. Traditional Egyptian chronology places it as the 44th.

Summary

1-6  Zacharias prays for offspring 7-8  Gabriel is sent with an answer promising a son 9-12  Zacharias asks a sign which is given 13-15  John the Baptist’s mission and character described
16-22  Story of Mary's miraculous conception 22-23 The birth of Jesus 23-27  Mary in distress is comforted by Jesus 28-29  Mary brings her child to her people, who reproach her 30-34  Jesus (speaking in infancy) vindicates his mother and describes his own prophetic character 35  Jesus the Word of Truth
36  God has no son 37  God alone to be worshipped
38-41 The miserable fate of Jewish and Christian sectaries

The story of Abraham: 42-46 He reproaches his father for idolatry 47  His father threatens to stone him 48-50  Abraham prays for his father, but separates himself from him 50-51  God gives him Isaac and Jacob, who were notable prophets 52  Moses—an apostle and prophet 53  Discourses with God privately 54 Aaron given him for an assistant

55-56 Ismaíl was a prophet acceptable to his Lord
57 ۩ 58  Idrís was taken up to heaven
59  God is bounteous to all true prophets
59, 60  The followers of former prophets compared with those of Muhammad
61-63  The reward of the faithful in Paradise
64  Gabriel comes down from heaven only when commanded
65 God is the only Lord—no name like his
66-67  The dead shall surely rise 68-72 The dead shall be judged on their knees
73-75 Believers and unbelievers compared
75-76  The prosperity of infidels a sign of God's reprobation
77-78  Good works better than riches
79-83  The doom of the wicked certain
84-85  Even the false gods will desert idolaters on judgment day
86-87  God sends devils to incite infidels to sin
88-92  Attributing children to God a great sin 93-95  God the only Lord—all creatures His servants
96  Believers to be rewarded with love
97  The Quran made easy for Muhammad
98  Miserable doom of all God's enemies

1 The "mysterious letters" 
The chapter opens with the Bismillah and the "mysterious letters," or muqattaʿat: Kaf; Ha; Ya; 'Ayn; and Sad. Muslims believe these letters to be the peculiar marks of the Quran, and to conceal several profound mysteries, the certain understanding of which has not been communicated to any mortal except for Muhammad.

The remaining 97 verses may be divided many ways.

16–30 Story of Maryam 
Q19:16–30 Translator George Sale was a solicitor and early member of the Society for Promoting Christian Knowledge. His verse structure differs slightly from that of the later Arabic King Faud I Edition. He interprets al-kitab as "the book of the Koran" when he translates the Story of Mary in the Quran
And remember in the book of the Koran the story of Mary; when she retired from her family to a place towards the east, and took a veil to conceal herself from them; and we sent our spirit Gabriel unto her, and he appeared unto her in the shape of a perfect man.
۝  20 She said, I fly for refuge unto the merciful God, that he may defend me from thee: if thou fearest him, thou wilt not approach me.
He answered, Verily I am the messenger of thy LORD, and am sent to give thee a holy son.
She said, How shall I have a son, seeing a man hath not touched me, and I am no harlot?
Gabriel replied, So shall it be: thy LORD saith, This is easy with me; and we will perform it, that we may ordain him for a sign unto men, and a mercy from us: for it is a thing which is decreed.
۞ Wherefore she conceived him; and she retired aside with him in her womb to a distant place; and the pains of child-birth came upon her near the trunk of a palm-tree. She said, Would to GOD I had died :before this, and had become a thing forgotten, and lost in oblivion.
And he who was beneath her called to her, saying, be not grieved; now hath GOD provided a stream under thee;
and do thou shake the body of the palm-tree, and it shall let fall ripe dates upon thee ready gathered. And eat, and drink, and calm thy mind.  Moreover, if thou see any man, and he question thee, say, Verily I have vowed a fast unto the Merciful: wherefore I will by no means speak to a man this day.
So she brought the child to her people, carrying him in her arms. And they said unto her, O Mary, now hast thou done a strange thing: O sister of Aaron, thy father was not a bad man, neither was thy mother a harlot.
۝30 But she made signs unto the child to answer them; and they said, How shall we speak to him, who is an infant in the cradle?
Whereupon the child said, Verily I am the servant of GOD; he hath given me the book of the gospel, and hath appointed me a prophet.

2–40 Jesus
 
The first section, verses 2–40, begins with the story of the prophet Zachariah and the birth of his son John, the story of Mary and the birth of her son Jesus, and a commentary on Jesus' identity according to Islam which rejects the Christian claim that he is God's son.

28 Sister of Aaron
In Q19:28, she is referred to as 'Sister of Aaron'. Several occurrences of the word "أخ" are found in the Quran when referring to kinship or sharing the same ancestor. According to authentic Hadith, a Christian from Najran did inquire about the verse, to which Muhammad replied:

Being the namesake of prophetess Miriam, the verse links Mary to Aaron specifically instead of Moses, who himself is a key figure in the Quran. According to Sahih International, the Arabic wording implies a descendancy of Aaron:

While Mary's geneology is unknown in the Bible, her relative Elizabeth was a descendant of Aaron. Orientalist George Sale writes:

Rhyme structures 

In its original Arabic, the text of chapter 19 progresses through a series of varying rhyme structures that correspond to the content being discussed. Throughout the initial narration of the stories of Zachariah and John, Mary and Jesus, and other prophets, verses rhyme based on the syllable 'ya'.  When the text moves on to a commentary on the true identity of Jesus, words rhyme due to a long 'ee' or 'oo' preceding a nasal 'm' or 'n', which is considered to give an air of settledness or finality to the subjects being discussed.  The first rhyme scheme is then resumed during further accounts of earlier prophets and changes to a rhyme based on a medium 'a' following a voiced 'd' when the Surah discusses punishments for those who reject truth and the prophets.  The strength of this vocalization is exchanged for the stronger still double 'd' sound when denouncing unbelievers for their criticism.

2–28 Sanaa 1
The sequence of the Sanaa manuscript (Sanaa 1) chapters do not follow any other known quranic order and folio 22 is shared with Chapter 9 (al-Tawbah) (Q9:122-129).

Recto

Verso

34 Significance of Mary 

Chapter 19 is the only surah in the Qur'an that is named after a woman. Mary, the figure from whom this Surah takes its name. Jesus is referred to by his familial connection to her in Q19:34, the identifying title 'son of Mary' places startling emphasis on Mary's motherhood in a culture in which individuals were identified by their descent from male family member.  This emphasis draws attention to the unique circumstances of Jesus's birth; it was not a biological process, and no father was involved, but it rejects the Christian belief that he was begotten by God. The text describes the agony of Mary's childbirth in great detail, including her wish that she had died long ago in order to avoid such pain.  Despite this great hardship, God is portrayed as compassionate and attentive to Mary's needs; He urges her not to worry and provides her with food.  Feminist reading of the text points to this treatment of childbirth as verification of the process's special significance.

Other scholars point to the interaction between Mary and the angel Gabriel as indicative of traditional gender roles at the time; when Mary, a solitary female, encounters the male angel, her first reaction is fear of the impropriety of the situation and uncertainty regarding the angel's intentions.  She can hear the angel's message and question him only after he assures her that he has come as a messenger from God.

Maryam in Syriac (ܡܪܝܡ) is a common adjective connoting blessing and perhaps the verb "[God] exalts her".

35–37 Dome of the Rock
The verses from Maryam 19:35–37, which are seen by Muslims as strongly reaffirming Jesus' prophethood to God, are quoted in inscriptions in the oldest extant Islamic monument, The Dome of the Rock in Jerusalem.

41–65 Abraham 
The second section, verses 41–65, tells of Abraham's departure from his family's idolatrous ways and then refers to many other prophets.  The text discusses the various responses of those who heard their prophecy and the fates those hearers met; throughout these descriptions, the oneness of God is emphasized.

66–98 Islamic view of the Trinity 

The third section, verses 66–98, confirms the reality of resurrection and offers depictions of the Day of Judgment alongside depictions of this life.

91–98 Birmingham manuscript

The Birmingham Quran manuscript preserves the final eight verses (Q19:91–98) of Chapter 19, Mayryam (plus parts of Chapter 18, Al-Kahf; and Chapter 20, "Taha"). Located in the Cadbury Research Library, It is written in the Arabic language in Hijazi script by unknown scribe(s).

The Manuscript has been radiocarbon dated to between 568 and 645 CE (in the Islamic calendar, between 56 BH and 25 AH). Saud al-Sarhan, Director of Center for Research and Islamic Studies in Riyadh, considers that the parchment might in fact have been reused as a palimpsest. Saud's perspective has been backed by a number of Saudi-based experts in Quranic history who deny that the Birmingham/Paris Quran could have been written during the lifetime of Muhammad. They emphasize that while Muhammad was alive, Quranic texts were written without any chapter decoration, marked verse endings or use of colored inks, and did not follow any standard sequence of surahs. They maintain that those features were introduced into Quranic practice in the time of the Caliph Uthman, and so it would be entirely possible that the Birmingham leaves could have been written then, but not earlier.

Q19:91–92 dissents from the Trinitarian Christian practice of calling upon God in the name of his ‘son’.  91That they attribute to the Most Merciful a son. 92And it is not appropriate for the Most Merciful that He should take a son. Q19:96 supports a requirement for "Faith and deeds"  96Indeed, those who have believed and done righteous deeds – the Most Merciful will appoint for them affection.

Notes
The notes are mostly by Sale who in turn relied heavily on Lewis Maracci's Latin translation. Maracci was a Roman Catholic cleric regular of the Mother of God of Lucca:

References

Sources

External links 

Quran 19 Clear Quran translation
Quran 19 Electronic Quran Project. King Saud University
XIX MARY A.J. Arberry translation
19. Maryam (Mary) Muhammad Asad translation
Quran 19 Ali Ünal translation
Quran 19 E. H. Palmer translation
19. Entitled, Mary; containing 80 verses George Sale translation
Quran 19  J. M. Rodwell translation
Quran 19 Rashad Khalifa translation
Quran 19 T.B.Irving translation
Q19:33, 50+ translations, islamawakened.com

Maryam
Mary, mother of Jesus
Jesus in Islam
John the Baptist